Tamil protests can refer to several mass protests involving Tamils in India and Sri Lanka and/or the Tamil diaspora:

Protests against the Sri Lankan Civil War (2008-09)
Protests against the Sri Lankan Civil War in Canada (2008-09)
2013 Anti-Sri Lanka protests
2017 pro-Jallikattu protests
2017 Tamil Nadu farmers' protest
Thoothukudi massacre (2018), occurred during the anti-Sterlite protests
2018 Tamil Nadu protests for Kaveri water sharing